The 2004 Irish local elections were held in all the counties, cities and towns of Ireland on Friday, 11 June 2004, on the same day as the European elections and referendum on the twenty-seventh amendment of the constitution. Polling was delayed until 19 June 2004 in County Roscommon, due to the sudden death of Councillor Gerry Donnelly.

Turnout was the highest for 20 years at around 60%, helped by the extra publicity of the referendum. The result was a major setback for Fianna Fáil, which saw its share of the vote drop by 7 percentage points from its 1999 result to only 32%, losing 20% of its council seats. The party lost its majority on Clare County Council for the first time in 70 years, and fell behind Fine Gael in Galway, Limerick and Waterford city councils. Labour's share of the vote remained static at 11% while Fine Gael dropped 1%. Both parties however won seats with the Labour Party becoming the largest party on Dublin City Council. Major gains were made by Sinn Féin which managed to double the number of seats it held, mainly at the expense of Fianna Fáil.

These were the first elections since the Local Government Act 2001 modernised council structures and abolished the dual mandate. Many new councillors were elected for the first time, most notably on Dublin City Council, where 33 of the 52 members were first-timers, which the City Manager described as "unprecedented in the history of local government". Many of the seats vacated by TDs and senators were won by family members.

Results 
Voters received different-coloured ballot papers for the European election, city/county council election, and referendum, all of which went into the same ballot box and were separated by colour once the boxes arrived at the count centre for the city/county. Not all voters received all ballots as the franchises differ. Voters in towns with town councils received an additional ballot for that election, cast in a separate ballot box and counted locally within the town.

County, city and town council seats

County and City Councils

County councils

City councils

Town councils

Borough councils

Town councils

See also
 Local government in the Republic of Ireland
 :Category:Irish local government councils

Notes

References

 
Local
Local
2004
June 2004 events in Europe